Japan joined the World Bank Group in August 1952. Loans that were taken out by Japan focused on improving infrastructure, having electrical power generation, improving water, establishing basic industry development and improving transportation. Japan now is the second-largest creditor to the World Bank, and in 1970 established an office in Tokyo.

Shifting from Borrowing to Lending 
Japan finished repaying its debt by 1990, at which point the World Bank and Japan established the Policy and Human Resources Development Fund (PHRD). Between 1950 and 1960 Japan was seen as the "Major Borrower" because of the total amount of loans they were taking out. At the turn of 1967, Japan graduated from "Borrower Status," instead becoming a creditor. From 1970 to 1980, Japan went forward to become the Largest Shareholder during 1984.

Japan's influence within the World Bank Group 

Masonori Yoshida is the current executive director for Japan within the World Bank. Yoshida works closely with 24 other executive directors within the World Bank to fight global poverty and also focus on development with 189 other countries. Yoshida previously held the alternative executive director role from 2000 to 2003 and became the executive director for Japan on August 6, 2018. Masonori Yoshida has not only kept within the World Bank Group but has also jumped to the International Monetary Fund and served as the Adviser to the European Department. Japan's voting power within the International Bank for Reconstruction and Development is 193,708 number of votes and currently holds about 7.79% of the votes within the IBRD. In the International Development Association (IDA), Japan has a total of 193,708 votes and that makes up about 7.79% of the votes. In the International Finance Corporation (IFC), Japan has a total of 163,349 votes and has about 6.01% of the votes. In the Multilateral Investment Guarantee Agency (MIGA) Japan has a total of 9,205 of the total number of votes which makes up 4.22% of the votes. Kenichi Nishikata became the alternative executive director for Japan in July 2017. Nishikata served as the Senior Adviser for the executive director of Japan from 2006 to 2009 and then became the alternative executive director for Japan. Nishikata has held several different leadership roles within Japan which made him a perfect fit as executive director.

Past Projects 
In total, Japan has had about 31 Loans from the World Bank. The final repayment was in July 1990. Since then Japan has become one of the top contributors that funds the World Bank.

Joint ventures with the World Bank 
The Government of Japan and the World Bank Group both have joint ventures, used to strengthen the relations between the government of Japan and the organization. The joint ventures are the Japan Policy and Human Resource Development Fund (PHRD), Japan Social Development Fund (JSDF), Climate Investment Fund (CIF) and Learning from Mega Disasters.

Japan policy and the Human Resource Development Fund (PHRD) 
In the JSDF, the Government of Japan has funded $3.0 Billion US dollars. The overall purpose for the Japan Policy and Human Resource Development Fund is to help with preparation and implementation which involve the World Bank. The PHRD has been very innovative when it comes to climate change because recently has started co-financing projects that are completely related to climate change. The PHRD is one of the largest funds within the World Bank, and Japan supports it since 1990, and within the last couple of years the PHRD has paid for at least one-third of the IBRD and IDA loans. Japan Policy and Human Resource Development Fund has also been credited with pushing for innovations. The top ten recipients during Fiscal Year 2006 of PHRA TA Grants were Vietnam receiving 10.8 million, Azerbaijan receiving 7.5 million, Kyrgyzstan receiving 4.7 million, The Philippines receiving 4.2 million, Albania receiving 4.0 million, Senegal receiving 4.0 million, Kenya receiving 3.2 million, Nigeria receiving 3.0 million, The Gambia receiving 3.0 million and Indonesia receiving 2.9 million.

Japan Social Development Fund (JSDF) 
The Japan Social Development Fund specializes in helping the individuals that were affected by the Asian Financial Crisis, and it focuses mostly on low-income countries. The Japan Social Development Fund was established to provide grants to the countries that need them, and there are three types of grant categories; Regular Program Grants, Special Program Grants, and Seed-Fund Grants. Regular Program Grants were grants that covered up to $3 million US dollars towards activities that would benefit disadvantaged individuals. Special Program Grants, helped the reconstruction of Afghanistan and pushed them forward to become a stable country. Lastly, Seed-Fund Grants are the grants which are used for the preparation phase during the process they are only helpful with $75,000 US dollars. The two main type of grants that Japan Social Development Fund focuses on are Project Grants and Capacity Building Grants. Project Grants are types of grants that focus of benefiting low-income individuals for a short term. Capacity Building Grants are grants that mainly focus on financing partnerships and strengthen relationships.

Climate Investment Fund (CIF) 
The Climate Investment Fund is another venture between the World Bank Group and the government of Japan. It focuses on fighting climate change by taking some action to become greener. The amount of money that the Climate Investment Fund has is about $8 billion, and these funds are mainly given to developing and middle-income countries so they can afford climate financing projects without taking a huge risk. Currently the Climate Investment Fund has gathered US$8 billion from 14 different countries and has invested in Climate-Smart Investments in 72 countries. About 57% of the projects that have been financed have been for the public sector while 43% of the projects have been for the private sector. There are four major factors of projects that the Climate Investment Fund focuses on: clean technology, climate resilience, energy access, and having sustainable forests.

Learning from Mega Disasters 
Another joint venture from the World Bank and Japan is the Learning from Mega Disasters. The Great East Japan Earthquake (GEJE) was 9.0 earthquake which shook Japan, causing a tsunami and a nuclear power plant disaster. The World Bank and the government of Japan both learned from the earthquake on how other countries should prepare themselves from natural disasters. This information also was given to other countries so they could learn how to prepare for natural disasters before they happened and what to do after they occurred.

World Bank Institute (WBI) 
Japan contributes to several different developing countries thanks to the help of the World Bank Institute, and their main focus is to help with initiatives that help developing countries prepare for natural disasters. Another initiative that Japan has focused with the help of the World Bank Institute is Universal Health Coverage.

Sustainable development bonds 
Sustainable development bonds is another venture that involved Japan and the World Bank. Recently the World Bank gathered about $2 Billion for the Sustainable Development Bonds, thanks to Japanese investors who currently make up about 85% of the money coming from Japan. The main focus of these bonds is to tackle food waste.

References 

World Bank Group relations
Economy of Japan